The Department of Trade and Industry was a department of the Isle of Man Government from 1996 to 2010.

History
The Industry Board was first established in 1981.

In 1986 it became the Department of Industry, following the creation of the Ministerial system.

From then until 1996 the department was known as the Department of Industry, when it was renamed the Department of Trade and Industry.

In 2010, the Department was merged into the newly created Department of Economic Development.

Department heads

Ministers of Trade and Industry
David Cretney MHK, 2006-2010
Alex Downie MLC, 2002-2006
David North MHK, 1996-2002

Ministers of Industry
Edmund Lowey MLC, 1992-1996
Allan Bell MHK, 1991-1996
Bernie May MHK, 1988-1991
Ian Anderson MLC, 1986-1991

Chairmen of the Board of Industry
Ian Anderson MLC, 1984-1986
Edward Kerruish MLC, 1981-1984

External links
 http://www.gov.im/dti/

Government of the Isle of Man
Economy of the Isle of Man